Max Ullrich (born 1994) is a Croatian alpine ski racer.

He competed at the 2015 World Championships in Beaver Creek, USA, in the Super-G.

His family owns the Ullrich gallery in Zagreb, which is the oldest gallery in the city.

References

1994 births
Croatian male alpine skiers
Living people